Thomas Kortegaard (born 2 July 1984) is a Danish former footballer who played as a midfielder.

He played most of his career for AC Horsens.

Club career

AaB
On 14 July 2003, Kortegaard was loaned out to FC Nordjylland. Kortegaard was moved up to the first team in the summer 2004. He played a big role on the team though his young age, and the club extended his contract in May 2006 until the summer 2007. However in 2007, the club didn't wanted to extend his contract further and he left the club.

AC Horsens
Just few hours after leaving AaB, it was announced, that Kortegaard had signed a two-year contract with AC Horsens. He got a new contract in May 2008.

Coaching career
Kortegaard announced his retirement on 16 August 2019 because he was struggling with aftermaths from a cancer operation and thus stopped his career. He became a part of Bo Henriksen's first team staff at AC Horsens instead. He left the position on 29 June 2020 because he was going to be a teacher at a sports school.

References

External links
AC Horsens profile
National team profile
Career statistics at Danmarks Radio

1984 births
Living people
Danish men's footballers
Thisted FC players
AaB Fodbold players
AC Horsens players
Danish Superliga players
Association football midfielders